The Napa Valley Register is a daily newspaper located in Napa, California. The paper began publication on August 10, 1863. By 1864, the newspaper had dropped “Valley” from its name, becoming simply the Napa Register, until returning to the original name over a century later. Covering a community more known for its wheat crop than wine grapes, the early Register would be unrecognizable to modern readers. A forum for gossip, tall-tales, opinion, moral instruction, aphorisms, propaganda, entertainment and, sporadically, hard news, the Register was one of the top two newspapers of early Napa.

The Register moved to daily publication in 1872 and George M. Francis became sole owner of the Register in 1878, upon the death of his business partner. Francis was succeeded in ownership by his son George H. Francis in 1932.

The paper remained with Francis and various partners until 1958, when it was sold to Scripps League, a small family chain.

The current editor is Dan Evans.  The Napa Valley Register is published by Napa Valley Publishing, which also publishes the St. Helena Star, The Weekly Calistogan, and American Canyon Eagle, and operates the website Inside Napa Valley. Evans unveiled a newly reconstituted editorial board in October 2022. The board is made up of three members of the newspaper's staff and seven community members.  It will assist in driving the official opinion of the paper. 

The paper was formerly owned by Scripps League Newspapers, which was acquired by Pulitzer in 1996; Lee Enterprises acquired Pulitzer in 2005.

References

External links
 
 

1863 establishments in California
Companies based in Napa County, California
Daily newspapers published in California
Daily newspapers published in the San Francisco Bay Area
History of Napa County, California
Napa, California
Napa Valley
Lee Enterprises publications
Publications established in 1863